In Greek mythology, Poeas, or Poias (Ancient Greek: Ποίας) was a king of Meliboea or Malis (Maleae) and one of the Argonauts.

Family 
Poeas was the son of King Thaumacus of Thaumacia and the father of the hero Philoctetes by Methone.

Mythology 
As an Argonaut, Poeas is identified as the greatest archer of the group. When facing the giant Talos, some accounts say Medea drugged the bronze giant and Poeas shot an arrow to poison him in his heel. Other sources cited his son Philoctetes as one of the Argonauts instead of him.

More famously, Poeas had a role in the apotheosis of Heracles, his friend. When Heracles realized he was dying from poisonous centaur blood he demanded a funeral pyre built and lit once he stood atop it. As none of his own men would light the pyre, a passer-by (Poeas) was asked by Heracles to light it. In return for this favor Heracles bestowed his famed bow and poison arrows upon Poeas. Other versions, had Philoctetes as the passer-by or that Poeas assigned Philoctetes the task.

Notes

References 

 Apollodorus, The Library with an English Translation by Sir James George Frazer, F.B.A., F.R.S. in 2 Volumes, Cambridge, MA, Harvard University Press; London, William Heinemann Ltd. 1921. . Online version at the Perseus Digital Library. Greek text available from the same website.
 Gaius Julius Hyginus, Fabulae from The Myths of Hyginus translated and edited by Mary Grant. University of Kansas Publications in Humanistic Studies. Online version at the Topos Text Project.
Stephanus of Byzantium, Stephani Byzantii Ethnicorum quae supersunt, edited by August Meineike (1790-1870), published 1849. A few entries from this important ancient handbook of place names have been translated by Brady Kiesling. Online version at the Topos Text Project.

Argonauts
Mythological Greek archers
Mythological kings of Thessaly
Kings in Greek mythology
Thessalian characters in Greek mythology
Mythology of Heracles